The 2017–18 South Pacific cyclone season was a slightly below-average season that produced 6 tropical cyclones, 3 of which became severe tropical cyclones. The season officially began on November 1, 2017, and ended on April 30, 2018; however, a tropical cyclone could form at any time between July 1, 2017, and June 30, 2018, and would count towards the season total. During the season, tropical cyclones were officially monitored by the Fiji Meteorological Service, MetService and the Australian Bureau of Meteorology, while the United States Joint Typhoon Warning Center (JTWC) also monitored the basin and issued warnings for American interests. The FMS attaches a number and an F suffix to significant tropical disturbances that form in or move into the basin, while the JTWC designates significant tropical cyclones with a number and a P suffix. The BoM, FMS and MetService all use the Australian Tropical Cyclone Intensity Scale and estimate wind speeds over a period of ten minutes, while the JTWC estimates sustained winds over a 1-minute period, which are subsequently compared to the Saffir–Simpson hurricane wind scale (SSHWS).



Seasonal forecasts

Ahead of the cyclone season, the Fiji Meteorological Service (FMS), Australian Bureau of Meteorology (BoM), New Zealand's MetService and National Institute of Water and Atmospheric Research (NIWA) and various other Pacific Meteorological services, all contributed towards the Island Climate Update tropical cyclone outlook that was released during October 2016. The outlook took into account the ENSO-neutral conditions that had been observed across the Pacific and analogue seasons that had ENSO-neutral and weak La Niña conditions occurring during the season. The outlook called for a near average number of tropical cyclones for the 2017–18 season, with eight to ten named tropical cyclones, to occur between 135°E and 120°W compared to an average of about 10. At least three of the tropical cyclones were expected to become Category 3 severe tropical cyclones, while two could become Category 4 severe tropical cyclones; they also noted that a Category 5 severe tropical cyclone was not likely to occur during the season.

In addition to contributing towards the Island Climate Update outlook, the FMS and the BoM issued their own seasonal forecasts for the South Pacific region. The BoM issued two seasonal forecasts for the Southern Pacific Ocean, for their self-defined eastern and western regions of the South Pacific Ocean. They predicted that the Western region between 142.5°E and 165°E, had a 48% chance of seeing activity above its average of 7 tropical cyclones. The BoM also predicted that the Eastern Region between 165°E and 120°W, had a 55% chance of seeing activity above its average of 4 tropical cyclones. Within their outlook the FMS predicted that between four and six tropical cyclones, would occur within the basin compared to an average of around 7.1 cyclones. At least one of the tropical cyclones was expected to intensify into a Category 3 or higher severe tropical cyclone. They also predicted that the main area for tropical cyclogenesis would be within the Coral Sea, to the west of the International Date Line.

Both the Island Climate Update and the FMS tropical cyclone outlooks assessed the risk of a tropical cyclone affecting a certain island or territory. The Island Climate Update Outlook predicted that New Caledonia, Tonga, New Zealand and Papua New Guinea had an above average chance of being impacted by a tropical cyclone or their remnants. They also predicted that the Solomon Islands, Fiji and Vanuatu had a near normal to normal risk of being impacted by one or more tropical cyclones. The Southern Cook Islands, American Samoa, Samoa, Niue, Tokelau, Tuvalu, as well as Wallis and Futuna were thought to have a below average chance of being impacted. It was also considered unlikely that the Northern Cook Islands, French Polynesia, Kiribati and the Pitcairn Islands would be affected by a tropical cyclone. The FMS's outlook predicted that Vanuatu, New Caledonia, Fiji as well as Wallis and Futuna had a normal chance of being impacted by a tropical cyclone. The outlook also predicted that the Solomon Islands, Tokelau, Samoa, Tonga, Niue, Cook Islands and French Polynesia had a reduced chance of being affected by a tropical cyclone. It was thought that there was a normal risk of Vanuatu, New Caledonia, Fiji and Samoa being impacted by at least one severe tropical cyclone, while other areas such as the Solomon Islands, Tokelau, Samoa, Tonga, Niue and French Polynesia, had a reduced chance of being impacted by a severe tropical cyclone.

Seasonal summary

Systems

Tropical Depression 04F

Formed on December 20, lasted on December 26. It never strengthened to a tropical storm.

Tropical Disturbance 05F

Formed on January 26, dissipated the next day, 27th. It never strengthened due to the wind shear.

Tropical Cyclone Fehi

Fehi entered the South Pacific basin from the Australian Region on 28th as a subtropical cyclone. It continued its south-southeast track while transitioning to an extratropical cyclone as it approached New Zealand.

As an extratropical cyclone, Fehi caused extensive damage in western New Zealand. Strong winds and heavy rain damaged hundreds of structures, with more than 100 later condemned. Waist-deep water flooded homes in Charleston and Westport. Pounding surf eroded beaches, exposing an old garbage dump at Cobden Beach which left thousands of garbage bags strewn about. Insurance loss were amounted at NZ$38.5 million (US$28.5 million).

Severe Tropical Cyclone Gita

Over the next couple of days, the system moved erratically near northern Vanuatu and remained poorly organized, with convection located to the south of the low-level circulation center. The system started to move south-eastwards on 5 February, towards the Fijian Islands and a favorable environment for further development. The system subsequently passed near the island nation during 8 February, where it developed into a tropical depression and started to move north-eastwards towards the Samoan Islands. The FMS subsequently named the system Tropical Cyclone Gita, after the United States National Weather Service Weather Forecast Office in Pago Pago requested that the system be named early for warning and humanitarian reasons.

After Gita was named, a prolonged period of rapid intensification ensued as it quickly intensified into a Category 1 tropical cyclone on the Australian tropical cyclone intensity scale, before it passed within  of Samoa and American Samoa. After moving past the Samoan Islands, Gita turned southeast and then southwards. On 11 February, Gita continued to intensify into a category 4 severe tropical cyclone. At the same time, Gita turned westward under the influence of a subtropical ridge to the south. This made Gita the strongest cyclone to strike Tonga in its recorded history.

Tropical Depression 08F

Formed on February 3 to the east of Fiji, and it followed an erratic track; however, it didn't strengthened beyond and it dissipated on February 11.

Severe Tropical Cyclone Hola

At this time the disturbance had a broad low-level circulation and was located within a very favourable environment for further development, with low vertical wind shear and warm sea surface temperatures. Over the next couple of days, the disturbance gradually developed further as it gradually moved westwards towards Vanuatu, under the influence of a subtropical ridge of high pressure. It was subsequently classified as a tropical depression by the FMS during March 5, before the United States Joint Typhoon Warning Center (JTWC) subsequently issued a Tropical Cyclone Formation Alert on the system later that day.

During March 6, the JTWC initiated advisories on the system and designated it as Tropical Cyclone 12P, after its broad low-level circulation center had slowly consolidated and the overall organisation of the cyclone had improved. After it was named, Hola started developing a weak low level eye feature, before it was classified as a category 2 tropical cyclone as it passed in between the islands of Pentecost and Ambrym. The system subsequently passed over the island of Malekula and moved into the Coral Sea during March 7, where it rapidly consolidated and developed a  pinhole eye. The FMS subsequently reported that Hola had become a Category 4 severe tropical cyclone and predicted that Hola would peak as a Category 5 severe tropical cyclone.

After peaking as a Category 4 severe tropical cyclone on the Australian scale, wind shear rapidly weakened the system as it passed to the west of New Caledonia as a Category 1 tropical cyclone. It continued to the southwest before transitioning to an subtropical storm as it approached New Zealand. It weakened and it degenerated to a remnant low to the northwest of the country.

Tropical Depression 10F (Linda)

The system was poorly organised with deep atmospheric convection, displaced to the east of the system's consolidating low-level circulation center. The disturbance was subsequently classified as Tropical Low 21U by the BoM during March 12, as it moved southwards within an area of low vertical wind shear and warm sea surface temperatures.

Tropical Cyclone Iris

At this time the system was poorly organised with deep atmospheric convection, located to the east of the low-level circulation centre. Over the next few days, the system remained weak as it moved erratically around the Solomon Islands and was classified as a tropical depression during March 22.

Tropical Cyclone Josie

At this stage, the system was poorly organised with atmospheric convection surrounding the system displaced to the northeast of the disturbance's weak low-level circulation. By 23:20 UTC that day, the system had strengthened into Tropical Depression 12F. Despite moderate shear, the system organized further into Tropical Cyclone Josie by March 31. 

Despite not making landfall, Cyclone Josie caused heavy rainfall and sustained gale-force winds in southern Fiji. Severe flooding occurred in the city of Nadi. Altogether, Josie left six people dead. Five people were washed away by floodwaters, of which four are confirmed dead and one is still missing.

Severe Tropical Cyclone Keni

Tropical Cyclone Keni impacted Fiji and caused the cast and crew of the 37th season of the American reality competition series, Survivor, to be temporarily evacuated to the production's base camp.

Tropical Depression 14F

Other systems

Over the next couple of days, the disturbances moved southeastwards into areas of high vertical wind shear, before they were last noted during December 18 and 19 as they dissipated to the southeast of Samoa.

On January 28, the JTWC issued a Tropical Cyclone Formation Alert on a tropical disturbance, which was located near the French Polynesian island of Rapa Iti. The system had a well defined low-level circulation, and was located within an area of warm sea surface temperatures and marginal vertical wind shear. The alert was subsequently cancelled during the next day, after the system's low level circulation center became ragged, and atmospheric convection was displaced to the east of the circulation center.

On May 4, 2018, a system identified as a subtropical cyclone formed east of 120°W, near 80°W, just a few hundred miles off the coast of Chile, with researchers unofficially naming the storm Lexi. The cyclone formed in an area without a Regional Specialized Meteorological Center, so it was not officially classified. On May 9, the satellite services division of the NOAA classified the system as a weak subtropical storm, despite occurring in cooler (below 20 °C) sea surface temperatures.

Season effects
This table lists all the storms that developed in the South Pacific to the east of longitude 160°E during the 2017–18 season. It includes their intensity on the Australian tropical cyclone intensity scale, duration, name, landfalls, deaths, and damages. All data is taken from RSMC Nadi and/or TCWC Wellington, and all of the damage figures are in 2017 USD.

|-
|  ||  || bgcolor=#| || bgcolor=#| || bgcolor=#| || None || None || None || 
|-
|  ||  || bgcolor=#| || bgcolor=#| || bgcolor=#| || None || None || None || 
|-
|  ||  || bgcolor=#| || bgcolor=#| || bgcolor=#| || Fiji || None || None || 
|-
|  ||  || bgcolor=#| || bgcolor=#| || bgcolor=#| || New Caledonia || None || None || 
|-
|  ||  || bgcolor=#| || bgcolor=#| || bgcolor=#| || New Caledonia, New Zealand || || None || 
|-
|  ||  || bgcolor=#| || bgcolor=#| || bgcolor=#| || Fiji, Wallis and Futuna, Samoan Islands, Niue, Tonga, New Caledonia, New Zealand || ||   || 
|-
|  ||  || bgcolor=#| || bgcolor=#| || bgcolor=#| || Fiji || None || None || 
|-
|  ||  || bgcolor=#| || bgcolor=#| || bgcolor=#| || Vanuatu, New Caledonia, New Zealand || Unknown ||   || 
|-
|  ||  || bgcolor=#| || bgcolor=#| || bgcolor=#| || None || None || None || 
|-
|  ||  || bgcolor=#| || bgcolor=#| || bgcolor=#| || Solomon Islands || None || None ||
|-
|  ||  || bgcolor=#| || bgcolor=#| || bgcolor=#| || Vanuatu, Fiji, Tonga ||  || 6 || 
|-
|  ||  || bgcolor=#||| bgcolor=#| || bgcolor=#| || Vanuatu, Fiji, Tonga ||  || None || 
|-
|  ||  || bgcolor=#||| bgcolor=#| || bgcolor=#| || Rotuma || Unknown || Unknown ||
|-

See also

Weather of 2017 and 2018
Tropical cyclones in 2017 and 2018
 List of Southern Hemisphere tropical cyclone seasons
 Atlantic hurricane seasons: 2017, 2018
 Pacific hurricane seasons: 2017, 2018
 Pacific typhoon seasons: 2017, 2018
 North Indian Ocean cyclone seasons: 2017, 2018
 2017–18 South-West Indian Ocean cyclone season
 2017–18 Australian region cyclone season

References

External links

 
South Pacific cyclone seasons
2017 SPAC
2018 SPAC